Digital design may refer to:

 Digital product design, a field in design which is focused on user interface design or interaction design
 Logic synthesis, a process by which an abstract specification of desired circuit behavior is turned into a design implementation in terms of logic gates